The 2023 Kazakhstan Super Cup was the 14th Kazakhstan Super Cup, an annual football match played between the winners of the previous season's Premier League, Astana, and the winners of the previous season's Kazakhstan Cup, Ordabasy. The match was played on 25 February 2023, at the Astana Arena in Astana. Astana won the match 2–1 for their 6th Super Cup title, the first in 3 years.

Background 
 
Ordabasy won the Kazakhstan Cup for the second time after their match against Akzhayik in the final went to extra time after initially finishing 4–4. Elkhan Astanov then scored a 119th minute penalty to give Ordabasy the title. Astana won their Super Cup place by virtue of winning the 2022 Kazakhstan Premier League.

Match details

See also
2022 Kazakhstan Premier League
2022 Kazakhstan Cup

References

2023
FC Astana matches
FC Ordabasy matches
Supercup